Blaak Heat (formerly known as Blaak Heat Shujaa) is a French-American outfit whose recordings blend psychedelic rock with a number of outside sources, such as traditional Middle Eastern music, progressive rock, surf rock, spaghetti western, and metal. The band was founded by Thomas Bellier and Antoine Morel-Vulliez in 2008 in Paris while they were graduate students at Sciences Po. In 2012, the band relocated to Los Angeles, signed to Tee Pee Records, and subsequently hired Orange County-based drummer Mike Amster. Blaak Heat has toured Europe and the United States, appearing at festivals such as Levitation Austin, Reverence Valada, and Red Smoke Fest. The band collaborated with Nobel Prize-nominated Gonzo poet Ron Whitehead on two of their releases, leading to multiple live appearances with Whitehead in the US and Scandinavia. Blaak Heat's latest full-length album, Shifting Mirrors, was produced by Grammy Award-winning producer Matt Hyde and came out in the Spring of 2016. It has been called "A new standard for a new generation" by PopMatters and "Almost too good to be believed" by Loudwire.

Members

Current members
 Thomas Bellier - guitar, vocals (2008–present)
 Mike Amster - drums (2012–present)
 Guillaume Théoden - bass (2016–present)
 Nicolas Heller - guitar (2016–present)
 Henry Evans - bass (2015–present)

Former members
 Tom Davies - bass (2015)
 Antoine Morel-Vulliez - bass (2008-2014)
 Timothée Gacon - drums (2008-2012)

Discography

Albums
 Blaak Heat Shujaa - 2010 - Improvising Beings
 The Edge Of An Era - 2013 - Tee Pee Records
 Shifting Mirrors - 2016 - Svart Records, Tee Pee Records

Extended plays
 The Storm Generation - 2012 - Tee Pee Records

References

External links
 
 Tee Pee Records

American psychedelic rock music groups